Contemporary dance is a genre of dance performance that developed during the mid-twentieth century and has since grown to become one of the dominant genres for formally trained dancers throughout the world, with particularly strong popularity in the U.S. and Europe. Although originally informed by and borrowing from classical, modern, and jazz styles, it has come to incorporate elements from many styles of dance. Due to its technical similarities, it is often perceived to be closely related to modern dance, ballet, and other classical concert dance styles.

In terms of the focus of its technique, contemporary dance tends to combine the strong but controlled legwork of ballet with modern that stresses on torso. It also employs contract-release, floor work, fall and recovery, and improvisation characteristics of modern dance. Unpredictable changes in rhythm, speed, and direction are often used, as well. Additionally, contemporary dance sometimes incorporates elements of non-western dance cultures, such as elements from African dance including bent knees, or movements from the Japanese contemporary dance, Butoh.

History

Contemporary dance draws on both classical ballet and modern dance, whereas postmodern dance was a direct and opposite response to modern dance. Merce Cunningham is considered to be the first choreographer to "develop an independent attitude towards modern dance" and defy the ideas that were established by it. In 1944 Cunningham accompanied his dance with music by John Cage, who observed that Cunningham's dance "no longer relies on linear elements (...) nor does it rely on a movement towards and away from climax. As in abstract painting, it is assumed that an element (a movement, a sound, a change of light) is in and of itself expressive; what it communicates is in large part determined by the observer themselves." Cunningham formed the Merce Cunningham Dance Company in 1953 and went on to create more than one hundred and fifty works for the company, many of which have been performed internationally by ballet and modern dance companies.

Cunningham's key ideas
Cunningham's key ideas include-
 Contemporary dance does refuse the classical ballet's leg technique in favour of modern dance's stress on the torso
 Contemporary dance is not necessarily narrative form of art
 Choreography that appears disordered, but nevertheless relies on technique
 Unpredictable changes in rhythm, speed, and direction 
 Multiple and simultaneous actions
 Suspension of perspective and symmetry in ballet scenic frame perspective such as front, center, and hierarchies
 Creative freedom
 Independence between dance and music
 Dance to be danced, not analyzed
 Innovative lighting, sets, and costumes in collaboration with Andy Warhol, Robert Rauschenberg, and Jasper Johns

Other pioneers of contemporary dance (the offspring of modern and postmodern) include Ruth St. Denis, Doris Humphrey, Mary Wigman, Pina Bausch, Francois Delsarte, Émile Jaques-Dalcroze, Paul Taylor, Rudolph von Laban, Loie Fuller, José Limón and Marie Rambert.

Choreographer's role
There is usually a choreographer who makes the creative decisions and decides whether the piece is an abstract or a narrative one. Dancers are selected based on their skill and training. The choreography is determined based on its relation to the music or sounds that is danced to. The role of music in contemporary dance is different from in other genres because it can serve as a backdrop to the piece. The choreographer has control over the costumes and their aesthetic value for the overall composition of the performance and also in regards to how they influence dancers’ movements.

Dance technique

Dance techniques and movement philosophies employed in contemporary dance may include Contemporary ballet, Dance improvisation, Interpretive dance, Lyrical dance, Modern dance styles from United States such as Graham technique, Humphrey-Weidman technique and Horton technique, Modern dance of Europe Bartenieff Fundamentals and the dance technique of Isadora Duncan (also see Free dance).

Contemporary dancers train using contemporary dance techniques as well as non-dance related practices such as Pilates, Yoga, the acting practice of Corporeal mime - Étienne Decroux technique and somatic practices such as Alexander technique, Feldenkrais Method, Sullivan Technique and Franklin-Methode, American contemporary techniques such as José Limón technique and Hawkins technique and Postmodern dance techniques such as Contact improvisation and Cunningham technique,  and Release technique.

Some well-known choreographers and creators of contemporary dance created schools and techniques of their own. Paul Taylor developed a dance technique called Taylor technique, which is now taught at modern dance schools like The Ailey School in New York City.

Dance and technology
Reflecting the situation in society at large, contemporary dance is increasingly incorporating overtly technological elements, and, in particular, robots. Robotics engineer/dancer Amy LaViers, for example, has incorporated cell phones in a contemporary dance piece calling attention to the issues surrounding our ever-increasing dependence on technology.

See also
 Modern dance
 Contemporary ballet
 London Contemporary Dance School
 Category: Contemporary dancers

References

External links

Contemporary-dance.org website